Roger Bordier (5 March 1923 – June 2015) was a French writer, winner of the 1961 Prix Renaudot.

Biography 
Bordier was born in Blois.  He began working as a journalist in Blois and Paris. He then became an art critic for Art today. He published his first collection of poems in Seghers. He penned short stories. His first novel was The Fifth Season, published by Calmann-Levy. His third novel, The Corn, won the Prix Renaudot in 1961. He then published A Golden Age, which was adapted for television by Fernand Marzelle and continued publishing essays on criticism.

Roger Bordier was a professor at the École nationale supérieure des arts décoratifs, where he taught history of modern art and sociology of contemporary aesthetics.

Works

References

External links

1923 births
2015 deaths
Writers from Blois
French journalists
20th-century French poets
Academic staff of Paris Sciences et Lettres University
French art critics
20th-century French novelists
21st-century French novelists
20th-century French male writers
Prix Renaudot winners
21st-century French poets
21st-century French male writers
French male essayists
French male poets
French male novelists
French male short story writers
20th-century French short story writers
21st-century French short story writers
20th-century French essayists
21st-century French essayists